|}

The Heroes Handicap Hurdle is a Premier Handicap National Hunt hurdle race in Great Britain which is open to horses aged four years or older. It is run at Sandown Park over a distance of about 2 miles and 7½ furlongs (2 miles 7 furlongs and 98 yards, or 4,716 metres), and during its running there are twelve hurdles to be jumped. It is a handicap race, and it is scheduled to take place each year in late January or early February.

The race was established in 1986, and it was originally run over 2 miles, 5 furlongs and 75 yards (4,293 metres). This was increased to its present length in 1993. The event's current title was introduced in 2008, prior to which it was known as the Sandown Handicap Hurdle. For much of its history the race was sponsored by Tote Bookmakers, and its title promoted such bets as the Tote Jackpot and the Tote Scoop6. Since 2020 it has been sponsored by Betway.

Winners
 Weights given in stones and pounds.

 The 1990 running was abandoned because of waterlogging.

 The 2012 running was abandoned due to frost.

 The 2014 running was abandoned due to going conditions.

See also
 Horseracing in Great Britain
 List of British National Hunt races
 Recurring events established in 1986  – this race is included under its former title, Sandown Handicap Hurdle.

References

 Racing Post:
, 
 

 pedigreequery.com – Heroes Handicap Hurdle – Sandown.
 

National Hunt races in Great Britain
Sandown Park Racecourse
National Hunt hurdle races
Recurring sporting events established in 1986